Vaibhav Talwar is an Indian model and film actor.

Personal details
He was born and brought up in New Delhi, India. He is into martial arts, and practised taekwondo.

He married Scherezade Shroff, sister of Indian fashion designer Anaita Shroff Adajania, in 2016. They worked for the same modeling agency in Delhi and started dating in November 2004.

Modelling
He debuted his modelling career with an assignment for Hugo Boss. He then went on working with reputed fashion designers like Tommy Hilfiger, J.J. Valaya, Raghuvendra Rathore, Aki Narula, Manish Malhotra, Narender Kumar, Siddarth Tytler, Kunal Rawal, Suneet Verma, and more.

With modelling brand image, he did print advertisements for prestigious brands like HP, Asian Paints, LG, Grasim, ABN AMRO, Airtel, Nokia, Manyavar, and several others.

He did television advertisements for reputed brands like NDTV, Asian Paints, Dulux paints, Citibank, Cadbury, Royal Stag, Hindustan Petroleum (HPCL), GNIIT, Vivel Shampoo, Sony Ericsson, LG, Samsung Mobiles, Vimal suitings, Tata Nano, Manyavar, and several others.

Filmography

He debuted Bollywood with Teen Patti starring Amitabh Bachchan and Ben Kingsley, directed by Leena Yadav. He acted in the film Mausam. He then acted in the film Love Breakups Zindagi with Dia Mirza. Earlier in his career he played a lead role in Jasoos Vijay, a BBC production.

Hindi
 Teen Patti in 2010
 Love Breakups Zindagi in 2011
 Mausam in 2011
 Jasoos Vijay
 He has also worked with many advertising firm

References

Living people
Indian male film actors
Male actors in Hindi cinema
Indian male models
People from New Delhi
1981 births
Indian male taekwondo practitioners